Kojetice is a municipality and village in Mělník District in the Central Bohemian Region of the Czech Republic. It has about 800 inhabitants.

History
The first written mention of Kojetice is from 1271.

References

External links

Villages in Mělník District